Mount Beatty is a mountain located on the border of Alberta and British Columbia on the Continental Divide. It was named in 1924 after David Beatty, a British naval officer of Irish ancestry who commanded ships in the First World War.

Geology

Mount Beatty is composed of sedimentary rock laid down during the Precambrian to Jurassic periods. Formed in shallow seas, this sedimentary rock was pushed east and over the top of younger rock during the Laramide orogeny.

Climate

Based on the Köppen climate classification, Mount Beatty is located in a subarctic climate zone with cold, snowy winters, and mild summers. Winter temperatures can drop below  with wind chill factors below .

See also
List of peaks on the British Columbia–Alberta border

References

Three-thousanders of Alberta
Three-thousanders of British Columbia